Ben Clay Donnell (July 17, 1936 – July 31, 2012) was an American football defensive end who played one season for the Los Angeles Chargers. He was drafted in the 7th round (77) by the Detroit Lions but did not play for them.

References

1936 births
2012 deaths
American football defensive ends
Players of American football from Tennessee
Los Angeles Chargers players
Vanderbilt Commodores football players